Metachanda classica is a moth species in the oecophorine tribe Metachandini. It was described by Edward Meyrick in 1911. Its type locality is on Mahé Island, Seychelles. It also occurs on Silhouette Island.

References

Oecophorinae
Moths described in 1911
Taxa named by Edward Meyrick
Moths of Seychelles